@Andheri is a 2014 Malayalam drama thriller film written and directed by Biju Bhaskar Nair. It stars Atul Kulkarni, and Sreenivasan in leads and Bineesh Kodiyeri, Disney James, Aparna Nair and Biyon in the supporting roles.

Plot 
Rajan Pillai is an underworld don in Mumbai. Sub-inspector Menon is an ordinary police officer. Menon is very much concerned about the family of his colleague who has been murdered while on duty. Menon shares a good emotional relationship with the two sons of his colleague. The elder of them Pappan is a taxi driver who is married and has a child. The younger one Appu is jobless. He is ready to do any job that he gets.

Biju Bhaskar in @ Andheri plots the deep emotional bond between two brothers, Pappan and Appu.

Cast 
 Atul Kulkarni as Rajan Pillai
 Bineesh Kodiyeri as Appu
 Sreenivasan as Sub Inspector Menon
 Disney James as Pappan
 Aparna Nair as Meera
 Biyon as Swami
 Anil Murali
 Fathima Babu
 Nandu
 Augustine

Soundtrack

The film features songs composed by M. Jayachandran, Alphons Joseph and Abhishek Ray and written by Ramesan Nair and Joffy Tharakan.

References

External links
 @Andheri at entertainment.oneindia.in

2010s Malayalam-language films